"The Games We Play" is a song by American rapper Pusha T, from his third studio album, Daytona (2018).

Background
Pusha took to the lyrics website Genius to explain the track's lyrical content in June.

Commercial performance
Upon the release of the featuring album, "The Games We Play" charted at number 100 on the US Billboard Hot 100 and number 50 on the Hot R&B/Hip-Hop Songs chart.

Charts

References

2018 songs
Pusha T songs
Song recordings produced by Kanye West
Songs written by Cynthia Biggs
Songs written by Dexter Wansel
Songs written by Jay-Z
Songs written by Kanye West
Songs written by Pusha T
Songs written by Ski Beatz